Chung Hua Middle School No. 3 (CHMS No. 3;古晉中華第三中學) is one of the 60 Chinese independent high schools in Malaysia, located in Kuching, Sarawak.

Schools in Sarawak
Secondary schools in Malaysia